Aalst is a village located 6 km south of Eindhoven, the Netherlands, on the Tongelreep stream and the road to Valkenswaard. It was an independent municipality until 1923, when it merged with the municipality of Waalre.

Aalst experienced rapid growth during the 1970s and 1980s as housing estates were built in the Ekenrooi area, which served as an overflow area for Eindhoven. Despite this development the area remains very green and pleasant with large stretches of managed forest and heathland. Notable places include 'De hut van Mie Pils', a cafe and restaurant located in the wooded area in the east of the municipality.

In September 1944, Aalst saw the British XXX Corps pass along the main road from Valkenswaard to Eindhoven as part of Operation Market Garden.

The spoken language is Kempenlands (an East Brabantian dialect, one of the many southern dialects of Dutch).

Economy 
In recent decades, Aalst has developed from an agricultural community into a village of Eindhoven. From 1919 there was an industrial company (Brabantia) that makes metals and plastics household products sold worldwide, located in Aalst. Today, Brabantia's head office is located in Valkenswaard.

Gallery

References 

Populated places in North Brabant
Former municipalities of North Brabant
Waalre